The NFL Play of the Year Award, presented as the Bridgestone Moment of the Year, is a National Football League award. It was first awarded in 2011, at the inaugural NFL Honors awards show. From 2012 onward, Bridgestone became the presenter of the award, which has since been annually presented at the NFL Honors.

Winners

References

National Football League trophies and awards